The 2009 Valencian Community motorcycle Grand Prix was the last round of the 2009 Grand Prix motorcycle racing season. It took place on the weekend of 6–8 November 2009 at the Circuit Ricardo Tormo. It was the final race of the 250cc two-stroke class, as Moto2 (600cc four-stroke) replaced it from 2010 onwards. The MotoGP race was won by Dani Pedrosa.

MotoGP classification

  – Casey Stoner did not start the race. His place on the grid was left vacant.

250 cc classification
Alex Debón was due to start on pole position, but due to injuries sustained in qualifying practice he did not take part in the race. Therefore, everyone else was moved up one place on the final starting grid.

125 cc classification

Championship standings after the race (MotoGP)
Below are the standings for the top five riders and constructors after round seventeen has concluded.

Riders' Championship standings

Constructors' Championship standings

 Note: Only the top five positions are included for both sets of standings.

References

Valencian Community motorcycle Grand Prix
Valencian
Valencian motorcycle
21st century in Valencia